Foxy Shazam is the third studio album by the American rock band Foxy Shazam. It was released on April 13, 2010, by Sire Records. The album was originally titled Au Contraire and was their debut major label release.

Track listing
All songs written and composed by Foxy Shazam.

Foxy Shazam

Au Contraire (pre-release)

B-sides
 "Teenage Demon Baby" - 3:36 (iTunes deluxe edition)
 "Some Kind of Love" - 3:07 (iTunes deluxe edition)
 "Dog In Love with Kitty" - 2:43 (Shockhound.com exclusive bonus track)
 "You and Me" - 4:30 (only on early pre-release version of the album)
 "Yesterday, Today and Tomorrow" - 3:33 (only on a limited tour edition 7" vinyl single of Oh Lord)

Personnel
Foxy Shazam
Eric Sean Nally - Vocals
Loren Daniel Turner - Guitars
Sky Vaughn White - Keyboards
Daisy Caplan - Bass
Alex Nauth - Horns/Backing vocals
Thomas Pridgen - Drums

Extra personnel
Luke Johnson, the drummer for bands Lostprophets and No Devotion, recorded the drum parts of the song "Unstoppable."

Charts

References

2010 albums
Foxy Shazam albums
Sire Records albums
Albums produced by John Feldmann